Otto "Mirror" Briggs (April 7, 1891 – October 28, 1943) was an American baseball outfielder, manager and team owner in the Negro leagues.

Career

Brigs played from 1915 to 1934, playing mostly with the Hilldale Club and the Bacharach Giants.

Briggs also managed both teams: Hilldale in 1917, 1919, and from 1927 to 1928, and the Giants from 1932 to 1934; that same year, he also managed the Otto Briggs All Stars. Two years later, Briggs became the owner of the Philadelphia Black Meteors.

References

Further reading
 Saunders, Jack (November 6, 1943). "Otto Briggs, Diamond Great, Dies in Philadelphia". The Pittsburgh Courier. p. 16
 Harrison Jr., Claude (February 19, 1957). "Proceeds of Otto Briggs Memorial Basketball Game Slated for Charity; Benefit Game Pits Big '5' Against Billy Yancy's Old Timers Sun.". Philadelphia Tribune. p. 11

External links
 and Baseball-Reference Black Baseball stats and Seamheads

1891 births
1943 deaths
Bacharach Giants players
Baseball players from North Carolina
Hilldale Club players
Indianapolis ABCs players
Negro league baseball managers
People from Kings Mountain, North Carolina
Baseball outfielders
20th-century African-American sportspeople